Judith Alyek (born 8 October 1971) is a Ugandan politician and the district Woman Representative for Kole District in Uganda's 10th Parliament. She is a member of the National Resistance Movement on whose ticket she ran on in the 2016 general elections. She also serves as the Chairperson on the Committee on HIV/AIDS and related diseases.

In the eleventh parliament she serves on the Committee on Equal Opportunities.

Background and education 
Judith Alyek attended primary at Atan Primary School in Kole District. Between 1987 and 1990, she attended St. Catherine SS in Lira for her O Levels and attained her UACE from Dr. Obote College, Boroboro in 1993.

Career 
Here is a detailed career history of Alyek:
2016 to date : District Women's Representative, Kole District
 2011–2015 : Technical Advisor, Maternal and Child Health, HIV/AIDS and Nutrition, AVSI Foundation
 2007–2010 : Senior Health Educator, Dokolo District local government
 2000–2006 : Health Inspector, Lira District local government

Memberships 
She serves on the following additional role of the Parliament of Uganda:
Chairman – Committee on HIV/AIDS and related diseases
Member – Business Committee
Member – Committee on Health
Member – Uganda Women Parliamentary Association (UWOPA)
Member – Board of the Uganda Aids Commission
Patron – SERVE Uganda 
Member – International Union of Health Promotion and Education (IUHPE)

Activism 
As Chairperson for the committee on HIV/AIDS and related diseases, she has called for the mandatory testing of men for HIV/AIDS. She has also called for local leaders to disclose their HIV status as an example to the people they lead.

In July 2017, she moved a motion for Implementation of all Policies and Legislations relating to Children. She urged for the formation of an authority that would make it easy monitor and implement Children's' Rights

In the wake of the death of Dickens Okello in 2018, she urged fellow members of parliament from the Lango region to review and recommend actions to be taken against "Indians who are accused of violating the rights of the people of Lango."

Marriage 
In 2017, Alyek claimed to be married to Richard Odongo and denied the claims by the deputy clan chief of Inomo clan that Ambrose Eger, then deceased, was her husband.

See also 

 Kole District
 List of members of the tenth Parliament of Uganda
 Parliament of Uganda

External links 

 Website of the Parliament of Uganda
 https://www.facebook.com/699420380098805/posts/kole-district-woman-mp-judith-alyek-has-been-involved-in-a-road-accident-she-has/3028098000564353/
 https://ug.linkedin.com/in/alyek-judith-56a5651a

References 

Living people
1971 births
Women members of the Parliament of Uganda
National Resistance Movement politicians
Members of the Parliament of Uganda
HIV/AIDS activists
Kole District
Place of birth missing (living people)
21st-century Ugandan politicians
21st-century Ugandan women politicians